Matt DeCanio (born April 5, 1977) is an American ex-professional racing cyclist.

DeCanio is an outspoken critic of doping in the sport, and founded the Stolen Underground anti-doping movement after voluntarily confessing to performance-enhancing drug use and serving a two-year ban for doping.

DeCanio was sued in 2008 by convicted doper Kayle Leogrande for defamation, after publishing a recorded telephone call between himself and Suzanne Sonye, although the suit was thrown out by a judge in the Superior Court of California.

In 2010 he was making a comeback to cycling, racing for French amateur team Olympique Cycliste Val d’Oise.

In 2022 DeCanio wrote an autobiography detailing his entire racing career and the fallout of him calling out Lance Armstrong and others for doping, long before Armstrong admitted it. He reveals in his book how he was seen as crazy for bringing to light all the doping in the sport, as well as blacklisted, slandered, and threatened.

Palmares

1995
 1st Junior Killington Stage Race
 1st  17-18 Junior Time Trial Championships
 3rd Stage 4 Tour of the Gila

1996
 5th Stage 3 Hessen Rundfahrt

1999
 17th ITT, U-23 World Championships

2001
 10th Stage 10 (ITT) Tour de Langkawi
 3rd Overall Tour of Willamette
 3rd Stage 2 Tour of the Gila

2002
 2nd Overall Tour de Toona
1st Stage 3 
 2nd Overall Tour de Beauce
3rd and  Stage 4
3rd Stage 7

2003
 5th Overall Sea Otter Classic (USA)
10th Stage 2 (ITT)
1st Stage 4
 2nd Copa America de Ciclismo, São Paulo (BRA)
 3rd Stage 2 Solano Bicycle Classic (USA)
 3rd Stage 1 Fitchburg Longsjo Classic, Royal Plaza Fitchburg (USA)

References

External links
Stolen Underground

Matt DeCanio at First Cycling
Olympique Cycliste Val d’Oise

American male cyclists
1977 births
Living people
Doping cases in cycling
Place of birth missing (living people)